Muraliganj is one of the administrative divisions of Madhepura district in the Indian state of  Bihar.  The block headquarters are located at a distance of 18 km from the district headquarters, namely, Madhepura.

Geography

Panchayats
Panchayats in Murliganj community development block are: Jitapur, Haripur Kala, Digghi, Singion, Raghunathpur, Kolhaypatti Dumriya, Rajni, Gangapur, Dinapatti Sakhuwa, Belo, Nadhi, Pokhram Parmanadpur, Bhatkhora, Tamot Parsa, Jorgama, Rampur and Parwa Navtol.

Demographics
In the 2001 census Murliganj Block had a population of 164,148.

MURLIGANJ

References

Community development blocks in Madhepura district